DVLF is the initialism for:
 Delaware Valley Legacy Fund
 Dictionnaire Vivant de la Langue Française